Syed Badrul Ahsan is a Bangladeshi journalist and author who currently serves as Editor-in-Charge of The Asian Age, a publication based in Dhaka. He previously served as the Press Minister at the High Commission of Bangladesh, London and has worked for numerous universities such as the University of Dhaka, Independent University, Bangladesh, and University of Liberal Arts Bangladesh as well as being a Fellow at Jawaharlal Nehru University. He has written a biography on the Founder of Bangladesh, Bangabandhu Sheikh Mujibur Rahman entitled From Rebel to Founding Father: Sheikh Mujibur Rahman to much critical acclaim. Ahsan regularly contributes to Dhaka Courier, First News, Dhaka Tribune, Bangla Tribune, The Daily Star Our Time, Indian Express, Asian Affairs and South Asia Monitor.

Career 
Ahsan has served as the executive editor and current affairs editor of The Daily Star. He edited Star Books Review and Literature.

Ahsan is the Editor-in-Charge of The Asian Age, a publication based in Dhaka. 

In 2020, Ahsan was nominated for the Sohel Samad Memorial Award of the Press Institute of Bangladesh.

Bibliography 

 From Rebel to Founding Father: Sheikh Mujibur Rahman
 Glory and Despair: The Politics of Tajuddin Ahmad (2008)
 History Makers in Our Times (2008)

References

Year of birth missing (living people)
Living people
Place of birth missing (living people)
Bangladeshi journalists
Bangladeshi writers
Bangladeshi editors
Academic staff of the University of Dhaka
Academic staff of the University of Liberal Arts Bangladesh
Jawaharlal Nehru University alumni